Sioux Falls Arena is a 7,500-seat multi-purpose arena located in Sioux Falls, South Dakota. The facility was built in 1961. It seats 6,113 for basketball games and 4,760 for indoor football and hockey.

It was the home of the Sioux Falls Skyforce basketball team (1989–2013), the Sioux Falls Storm indoor football team, and the Sioux Falls Stampede ice hockey team, as well as a variety of state high school championship events.

The Sioux Falls Arena hosted the men's and women's Summit League Basketball Championship from 2009 until the opening of the Denny Sanford PREMIER Center in 2014.

Beginning in the fall of 2014, the Arena has been the home of Augustana University Vikings men's and women's basketball games.

Elvis Presley performed one of his final concerts here on June 22, 1977.

References

External links

Official website

Basketball venues in South Dakota
Defunct NBA G League venues
Indoor arenas in South Dakota
Indoor ice hockey venues in the United States
Sioux Falls Skyforce
Sioux Falls Storm
Sports venues in Sioux Falls, South Dakota